Amy is an original motion picture soundtrack to the 2015 film of the same name. It was released by Island Records on 30 October 2015. It is also the second posthumous compilation album by English singer and songwriter Amy Winehouse (the subject of the film). It features unreleased songs and demos that were included in the documentary and also features music by Brazilian composer Antônio Pinto. The soundtrack peaked at number 19 on the UK Albums Chart.

Background
On 8 October 2015, it was announced by Island Records that the original soundtrack for Amy would be released on 30 October 2015. On 26 October 2015, a two-minute sampler of the soundtrack was released on Facebook and Twitter. The soundtrack was later released for the second time on vinyl in the United Kingdom and Ireland on 1 April 2016.

Description
The album includes well-known tracks by Winehouse, such as "Stronger Than Me", "Tears Dry on Their Own" and "Back to Black", live sessions of "What Is It About Men", "Rehab", "We're Still Friends" and "Love Is a Losing Game", a downtempo version of "Some Unholy War", a demo version of "Like Smoke", a cover of The Zutons' "Valerie" performed by Winehouse and Mark Ronson, and a 2011 version of "Body and Soul" performed by Winehouse and Tony Bennett. The soundtrack is the second posthumous compilation album by Winehouse. The album also features original compositions that were included on the documentary by Antônio Pinto.

Accolades
In late October 2015, director Asif Kapadia won an award for Best Soundtrack for the original motion picture album for Amy at the Film Club's The Lost Weekend Awards. As of June 2016, the soundtrack itself has been nominated for a total of four awards; including Best Soundtrack at the St. Louis Film Critics Association and the music behind the film has led Winehouse a posthumous nomination at the 2016 BRIT Awards for British Female Solo Artist and Winehouse posthumously won a Grammy Award for Best Music Film at the 2016 Grammy Awards. This was the ninth nomination of Winehouse's career for this award and the third posthumous. In December 2016, the nominations for the 2017 Grammy Awards were announced, and Amy was nominated for Grammy Award for Best Compilation Soundtrack for Visual Media.

Track listing

Charts

Certifications

Release history

References

2015 compilation albums
2015 soundtrack albums
Amy Winehouse compilation albums
Compilation albums published posthumously
Documentary film soundtracks
Island Records soundtracks